William Lea (b Stone, Worcestershire 6 June 1820 - d Droitwich 24 September 1889) was Archdeacon of Worcester from 1881 to 1889.
  
Walters was educated at Brasenose College, Oxford, matriculating in 1839 and graduating B.A. in  1842, and was ordained in 1845. He was for many years the Vicar of St Peter, Droitwich.

References

Alumni of Brasenose College, Oxford
Archdeacons of Worcester
19th-century English Anglican priests
People from Wyre Forest District
1820 births
1889 deaths